In enzymology, a CoA-glutathione reductase is an enzyme that catalyzes the chemical reaction

CoA + glutathione + NADP+  CoA-glutathione + NADPH + H+

The 3 substrates of this enzyme are CoA, glutathione, and NADP+, whereas its 3 products are CoA-glutathione, NADPH, and H+.

This enzyme belongs to the family of oxidoreductases, specifically those acting on a sulfur group of donors with NAD+ or NADP+ as acceptor.  The systematic name of this enzyme class is glutathione:NADP+ oxidoreductase (CoA-acylating). Other names in common use include coenzyme A glutathione disulfide reductase, NADPH-dependent coenzyme A-SS-glutathione reductase, coenzyme A disulfide-glutathione reductase, and NADPH:CoA-glutathione oxidoreductase.  This enzyme participates in cysteine metabolism.  It employs one cofactor, FAD.

References

 
 
 

EC 1.8.1
NADPH-dependent enzymes
Flavoproteins
Enzymes of unknown structure